Morrie Ewans (16 January 1894 – 23 June 1971) was an Australian rules footballer who played with Carlton in the Victorian Football League (VFL).

Notes

External links 		
		
Morrie Ewans's profile at Blueseum		
		
		
		
		
1894 births
Australian rules footballers from Victoria (Australia)		
Carlton Football Club players
Brunswick Football Club players
Australian military personnel of World War I
1971 deaths